Larry Gibbs Asante (born March 7, 1988) is a former American football safety. He was selected by the Cleveland Browns in the fifth round of the 2010 NFL Draft. He played college football at Nebraska.

Early years
Asante was born in Compton, California. He attended both Annandale High School in Annandale, VA and then the Hayfield Secondary School outside Alexandria, Virginia, where he earned all-league honors as a running back in the AAA Patriot Division.

College career

Coffeyville Community College
Asante registered 76 tackles, 11 tackles for loss, three blocked kicks and an interception as a linebacker at Coffeyville Community College.

Nebraska
Asante entered the 2007 season as the starting strong safety after transitioning from linebacker in the spring. He played in twelve games, starting ten of them.

Asante started twelve games of the thirteen he played in 2008. He finished the 2008 season as |Nebraska's second-leading tackler with 67 tackles, including 45 solo tackles. He made at least five tackles in eight games, led by a career-high 13 stops at Oklahoma.

Asante finished his last year at Nebraska with a career-high 79 tackles, including 42 solo stops. He forced two fumbles and recorded two interceptions, one of which he returned for a touchdown. He started all 14 games in 2009 for a unit that led the nation in scoring defense and pass efficiency defense. He was selected to the first-team All-Big 12 team by conference coaches and Rival.com.

Professional career

Cleveland Browns
The Cleveland Browns selected Asante in the fifth round (160th overall) in the 2010 NFL Draft.

Asante and the Browns agreed to a four-year contract worth about $1.96 million on July 16, 2010.

Asante was waived by the Cleveland Browns on September 4, 2010.

On September 5, 2010 Asante was signed to the Cleveland Browns practice squad.

Tampa Bay Buccaneers
Asante was signed off the Tampa Bay Buccaneers practice squad after a season-ending injury to starting rookie Cody Grimm. He appeared in the final two games of the 2010 season, recording an interception against Drew Brees in the season finale against the New Orleans Saints. He was released on August 30, 2012.

Indianapolis Colts

Asante signed a reserve/future contract with the Indianapolis Colts on December 31, 2012.

Oakland Raiders
Asante signed with the Oakland Raiders on August 6, 2014.

References

External links
 Cleveland Browns bio
 Nebraska Cornhuskers bio

1988 births
Living people
American sportspeople of Ghanaian descent
Sportspeople from Alexandria, Virginia
Players of American football from Virginia
American football safeties
Coffeyville Red Ravens football players
Nebraska Cornhuskers football players
Cleveland Browns players
Tampa Bay Buccaneers players
Indianapolis Colts players
Oakland Raiders players
Annandale High School alumni